Etimesgut or Etimesut, formerly Ahimesut, is a metropolitan district of Ankara Province in the Central Anatolia region of Turkey, mainly consisting of large public housing projects,  from Ankara city centre. According to 2010 census, the population of Etimesgut is 386,879.

History
Archaeological research shows habitation since 2000 BC, including a Phrygian settlement in the 8th century BC. Then of course the district began to share the history of the city of Ankara with its Lydians, Persians, Galatians, Ancient Romans, Byzantines and finally Turks. Etimesgut is on the ancient Silk Road to the orient, and still today the road and railway from Ankara to Istanbul pass through the district.

Atatürk was fond of the area and would come here to ride horses and chat to the locals. He had a room in the building that is the public health laboratory today, and many other public buildings, including the hospital and the post office, that were built by his order still stand today.

Etimesgut began as a housing project of 50 homes ordered by Atatürk in 1924 to accommodate Turkish refugees from Bulgaria. From the 1950s, as poverty forced people to migrate from the countryside into the city much illegal housing gecekondu was thrown up in this district. Some of this has been replaced by public housing projects such as Elvankent, Eryaman and Güzelkent and also military and civil service accommodation. However much gecekondu remains, inhabited by working-class people from cities such as Erzurum, many of whom commute to jobs in the city of Ankara.
The Islamic terrorist organisation Hizbullah had a number of hidden cells here in the 1990s.

Present
The area has only the most basic shops and amenities.  Almost all of the housing in Etimesgut is apartment buildings except for the Güzelkent project. As building land in the city of Ankara is now impossible to find, areas like this on the fringes of the city, where building land is cheap, are growing faster and faster.

Public buildings include the sugar factory, the Turkish aviation authority headquarters at Etimesgut Airport and a military training camp.

The local football team Etimesgut Şekerspor has a chequered history; in recent years it has gained popularity by hiring former national team player Sergen Yalçın.

Demographics

Planned security campus
The construction of a new building in Etimesgut is underway, to serve as the joint new headquarters of the Turkish National Intelligence Organization (MİT), the Ministry of National Defence, and the Turkish General Staff together with the commands of the Army, Navy and Air Force branches of the Turkish Armed Forces. Reportedly, the move, which will turn the area into a "security campus" comparable to the US Pentagon, is part of measures taken after the failed 2016 Turkish coup d'état attempt.

Neighborhoods

Former broadcasting site
At Etimesgut, there was a longwave broadcasting station with two masts each 256 metres tall, which worked on 198 kHz.

Places of interest
 Ankara Aviation Museum

See also
 Eryaman
 Ankara

Image gallery

Notes

References

External links

 District governor's official website 
 District municipality's official website 

Populated places in Ankara Province
 
Illegal housing